Kuridala is a former mining township and locality in the Shire of Cloncurry, Queensland, Australia. In the  the locality of Kuridala had a population of 10 people.

Geography
Ballara is the now abandoned ruins of a settlement that supported the Wee MacGregor Mine. It is the north-west of the locality.

Road infrastructure
The Cloncurry–Dajarra Road runs through from north to south-west.

History
The town was originally named Gulatten, then Hampden, then Friezland, and finally Kuridala in October 1916. Kuridala is reportedly an Aboriginal word, language and dialect not recorded, meaning eagle hawk.

Friezland Provisional School opened circa 1901 and closed in 1904 due to low student numbers. It reopened in 1906. On 1 January 1909 it became Friezland State School. In 1920 the school was renamed Kuridala State School in 1920. It closed circa 1932.

Ballara State School opened circa May 1919 and closed circa March 1925.

In the  Kuridala had a population of 10 people.

Heritage listings 
Kuridala has a number of heritage-listed sites, including:
 Kuridala Township, Hampden Smelter and Mining Complex

 Wee MacGregor railway

See also
 List of tramways in Queensland

References

External links 

 

 
Shire of Cloncurry
Localities in Queensland